McGregor High School is a public high school located in McGregor, Texas and classified as a 3A school by the UIL. It is part of the McGregor Independent School District located in McLennan County, Texas. In 2015, the school was rated "Met Standard" by the Texas Education Agency.

Athletics
McGregor High School participates in these sports 

Baseball
Basketball
Cross Country
Football
Golf
Powerlifting
Softball
Tennis
Track and Field
Volleyball

State Finalists
 
Football - 
1979(2A), 1987(3A) 
Boys' Basketball - 
1957(1A)
State Champions—Girls Golf 2019 3A

Rocket Science
McGregor High School is a member school of IGNITE SystemsGo, an aeroscience education program. MHS participates in an annual gathering of all participating schools at Fredericksburg, Texas where they can launch their rockets.

Robotics
MHS hosts a BEST Robotics team, whose goal is to build a robot with given materials, create a project notebook detailing the design aspects of the robot, direct a booth presenting more information about their robot to a judging team, and participating in a school spirit event.

2010 - Awards: 1st Place Overall, 2nd Place Robot, Best Project Notebook, Most Robust Machine, Highest Scoring Round.

References

External links
McGregor Independent School District

Schools in McLennan County, Texas
Public high schools in Texas